Moghavemat Basij Shahrekord Futsal Club (Persian: باشگاه فوتسال مقاومت بسیج شهرکرد) is an Iranian futsal club based in Shahrekord, Iran. They currently compete in the Iran Futsal's 2nd Division, the 3rd tier of Iranian futsal.

Season-by-season 
The table below chronicles the achievements of the Club in various competitions.

Famous players 
  Mostafa Nazari

References 

Futsal clubs in Iran
Sport in Shahrekord